Robert Young M.A. (d. 9 August 1716) was a Canon of Windsor from 1673 to 1716.

Career

He was educated at Eton College and King's College, Cambridge.

He was appointed:
Chaplain to Prince Rupert
Lower Master of Eton College to 1672
Rector of Eversden, Northamptonshire 1683
Fellow of Eton College 1693

He was appointed to the first stall in St George's Chapel, Windsor Castle in 1673, and held the stall until 1716.

Notes 

1716 deaths
Canons of Windsor
Fellows of Eton College
People educated at Eton College
Alumni of King's College, Cambridge
Year of birth missing